ACJ may refer to:

 Acromioclavicular joint
 Airbus Corporate Jets
 American Council for Judaism
 Asian College of Journalism, Bangalore
 Asian College of Journalism, Chennai
 Anuradhapura Airport (IATA: ACJ)
 ACJ O Shopping Corporation, owner of Philippines channel O Shopping

See also